Out On The Fringe is the debut solo studio album by Australian singer Daryl Braithwaite released in 1979. 
"Prove Your Love" and "Like a Child" were released as singles from the album.

Track listing
"Out On The Fringe"
"I Thought It Was You"
"Hit Onto Something Good"
"Love Like A Child"
"Bandits"
"Desperately"
"They Don't See What I Do"
"Prove Your Love"
"Lips That Taste Of Wine"
"That's Right"
"Out On The Fringe (Reprise)"

Personnel
Daryl Braithwaite - vocals
Joey Harris - guitars
Terry Shaddick - guitars and backing vocals
Bruce Donnelly, Steve Halter - keyboards
Mark Browne - bass guitar
Mark Shulman - sitar
Mike Botts, Guy Shiffman, John Dick, Art Wood - drums
Johnny Conga - percussion
Steve Kipner, Peter Beckett - backing vocals

Release history

References

Daryl Braithwaite albums
1979 albums